The 2021 Princeton Tigers football team represented Princeton University in the 2021 NCAA Division I FCS football season as a member of the Ivy League. The team was led by 11th-year head coach Bob Surace and played its home games at Powers Field at Princeton Stadium. Princeton averaged 7,018 fans per game.

Schedule

References

Princeton
Princeton Tigers football seasons
Ivy League football champion seasons
Princeton Tigers football